The Taymyrsky mine is a large copper mine in the center of Russia in Krasnoyarsk Krai.

See also 
 List of mines in Russia

References 

Copper mines in Russia
Krasnoyarsk Krai